The three-mine policy, introduced in 1984 and abandoned in 1996, was a policy of the government of Australia to limit the number of uranium mines in the country to three.

History
The foundations of the three-mine policy for uranium mining were laid in 1982, when, at a conference of the Australian Labor Party, the party decided to adopt a "no new mines" policy. At the time, two uranium mines were operating, both in the Northern Territory, Ranger and Nabarlek. However, this new policy left a loophole, as it permitted uranium to be mined as a by-product of other mining operations. The later exception allowed for development of the Olympic Dam mine, located in South Australia, as it also contained gold and copper.

The following year, 1983, Labor won the federal elections and came into power for the first time since 1975.

The three-mine policy was officially introduced in 1984, after the federal elections that year had confirmed Bob Hawke of the Labor Party as Prime Minister of Australia. The policy restricted uranium mining in Australia to three existing mines, Ranger, Nabarlek and Olympic Dam.

The policy was abandoned in 1996, after the 1996 federal election replaced the Labor Party with John Howard's Coalition in power. The new policy was to develop the country's uranium mining industry and uranium exports.

The Australian Labor Party changed back its policy in the 1990s to a "no new mines" policy to allow uranium mines already approved by the Coalition government to go ahead. With the opening of a fourth uranium mine in Australia in 2001, the Beverley uranium mine, and the approval of a fifth mine, the Honeymoon uranium mine, Labor's stand had essentially become a "five-mine policy", as Nabarlek had since been closed.

The Labor Party, however, continued its opposition to increased uranium mining until 2006, when, under the leadership of Kim Beazley, discussions to abandon the "no new mines" policy were initiated. In April 2007, the Labor party, under the new leadership of Kevin Rudd voted at their national conference to abandon the policy. The vote was only won by a narrow margin- 205 to 190, and heavy internal criticism resulted.

State-based uranium mining bans 
Individual states continued their ban on uranium mining, however, with Western Australia lifting its six-year-old ban in 2008 after state elections, which saw the Labor Party replaced in government by the Liberal Party. Queensland continues to impose a ban on uranium mining but trade unions have advocated the end of the ban in the hope of uranium mining creating more jobs. Uranium mining remains banned in Victoria and New South Wales, though exploration for uranium is permitted in the latter. Uranium mining is permitted in Tasmania, but no uranium mines have been established there.

References

External links
 Australian Federal Government
 McKay, A.D. and Meiitis, Y., Australia's uranium resources, geology and development of deposits, publisher: AGSO-Geoscience Australia, published: 2001, 

Political history of Australia
1984 introductions
1996 disestablishments in Australia
Uranium mining in Australia